Occupational Safety and Health Convention, 1981 is an International Labour Organization Convention, number 155.

It was established in 1981, with the preamble stating:
Having decided upon the adoption of certain proposals with regard to safety and health and the working environment,...

In 2002, an additional protocol was adopted to this convention.

Ratifications 

As of February 2023, the convention had been ratified by 76 states, 17 of which have also ratified the additional protocol.

References

External links 
Text.
Ratifications.

International Labour Organization conventions
Health treaties
Occupational safety and health treaties
Treaties concluded in 1981
Treaties entered into force in 1983
Treaties of Albania
Treaties of Algeria
Treaties of Antigua and Barbuda
Treaties of Argentina
Treaties of Bahrain
Treaties of Belarus
Treaties of Australia
Treaties of Belgium
Treaties of Belize
Treaties of Bosnia and Herzegovina
Treaties of Brazil
Treaties of Cape Verde
Treaties of the People's Republic of China
Treaties of the Central African Republic
Treaties of Croatia
Treaties of Cuba
Treaties of Cyprus
Treaties of Czechoslovakia
Treaties of the Czech Republic
Treaties of Denmark
Treaties of El Salvador
Treaties of the People's Democratic Republic of Ethiopia
Treaties of Fiji
Treaties of Finland
Treaties of Gabon
Treaties of Grenada
Treaties of Guyana
Treaties of Hungary
Treaties of Iceland
Treaties of Ireland
Treaties of Kazakhstan
Treaties of South Korea
Treaties of Latvia
Treaties of Lesotho
Treaties of Luxembourg
Treaties of Mali
Treaties of Mauritius
Treaties of Mexico
Treaties of Moldova
Treaties of Montenegro
Treaties of Mongolia
Treaties of the Netherlands
Treaties of New Zealand
Treaties of Niger
Treaties of Nigeria
Treaties of Norway
Treaties of Portugal
Treaties of Russia
Treaties of São Tomé and Príncipe
Treaties of Serbia and Montenegro
Treaties of Yugoslavia
Treaties of North Macedonia
Treaties of Seychelles
Treaties of Slovakia
Treaties of Slovenia
Treaties of South Africa
Treaties of Sweden
Treaties of Spain
Treaties of Syria
Treaties of Tajikistan
Treaties of Turkey
Treaties of Ukraine
Treaties of Uruguay
Treaties of Venezuela
Treaties of Vietnam
Treaties of Zambia
Treaties of Zimbabwe
1981 in labor relations